Ivan Štšeglov (born 8 July 2000) is an Estonian swimmer. In 2019, he represented Estonia at the 2019 World Aquatics Championships in Gwangju, South Korea. He competed in the men's 200 metre backstroke event where he set a new Estonian record of 2:01.19.

In 2018, he competed in the boys' 100 metre backstroke and boys' 200 metre backstroke events at the 2018 Summer Youth Olympics held in Buenos Aires, Argentina.

References 

Living people
2000 births
Place of birth missing (living people)
Estonian male backstroke swimmers
Swimmers at the 2018 Summer Youth Olympics